Ahlcon Public School is a co-educational English Medium public school, established in 1988 by the Shanti Devi Progressive Education Society in New Delhi, India and is duly recognized by the Directorate of Education, Govt. of NCT, Delhi. The school is affiliated to Central Board of Secondary Education and offers AISSE and AISSCE at Standard X and XII respectively. The school has four student houses – Dhruv, Eklavya, Prahlad and Shravan.

Campus & facilities 
The school provides various facilities to its students which include two libraries that house 20,000 books, a reading room, a video library, school counseling centre, a recently renovated auditorium, student canteens, stationery supply shop and medical centre. The school has laboratories for Computing, Physics, Chemistry, Biology, Multimedia, Language, Robotics, and Mathematics.
The Sports Complex has facilities for cricket, football, basketball, table tennis, yoga and badminton. It also comprises separate play facilities for the nursery and prep block students.

Subjects & activities 
Besides using English as its medium of instruction for the major courses (Elementary courses, Mathematics, Sciences, Economics & Social Studies), the school also imparts communication skills in Hindi, French, and Sanskrit. There are three main elective streams for study beyond Class 10th: Science, Commerce, and Humanities.

Co-curricular activities include art, crafts, dance, and vocal and instrumental music. Culturally, the school has computer, drama, quizzing, yoga, music (instrumental as well as vocal) and art groups. The school is host to myriad inter-school as well as intra-school competitions. The school has also founded a charitable wing for the economically disadvantaged and imparts night classes to their children as well. Silico Battles, an inter-school computer festival organized every year by the school, has seen record participation from the best schools of Delhi and NCR.

The school magazine, Vivitsa, is a popular annual publication which highlights the achievements of the school's students in various arenas, and publishes selected creative pieces submitted by various students. The school celebrated the Silver Jubilee of its establishment in 2013.

References

External links 
 School website
 Rated as one of the top schools in east Delhi

Schools in East Delhi
New Delhi
Educational institutions established in 1988
1988 establishments in Delhi